The Metropolitan University (Unimet) is a Venezuelan university founded in 1970 by a group of entrepreneurs led by Eugenio Mendoza Goiticoa in the terrains donated by the businessman Pius Schlageter, father of the Venezuelan painter Eduardo Schlageter. It is in the Terrazas del Ávila section of Caracas.

History 
The university started as a nonprofit organization in 1964 with a mission to develop the curricula for what would become the "Universidad Metropolitana". On 1 October 1970, the "Consejo Nacional de Universidades" approved the plans and projects of the fledgling university.

The first campus was located on the old building of the "Colegio America" in the district of San Bernardino, and began classes on 22 October of that same year.

The first class of 198 students could choose between 5 undergraduate degrees:
 Mechanical engineering
 Electrical engineering 
 Chemical engineering 
 Mathematics 
 Business and Administration

In 1976 the campus was moved to its current location on the eastern city district of "Terrazas del Ávila."

Current campus 

Today, the University has 5,000 students and approximately 500 professors. It is a business-oriented private university, and Business Administration being one of the most important courses offered.

The academic undergraduate courses include: Economics, Accounting, Business Administration, Law, Education, Modern Languages, Engineering (Chemical, Mechanic, Systems, Electrical, Civil & Production), Psychology and in 2003, it became the first University in Venezuela to offer a Liberal Studies course.

Degrees
It offers the following undergraduate programs (B.Sc.):
 College of Arts and Sciences:
Applied Mathematics
Psychology
Modern Languages
Education
 College of Engineering:
Civil Engineering
Chemical Engineering
Electrical Engineering
Mechanical Engineering
Production Engineering
Systems Engineering
 College of Social and Humanistic Sciences:
 Business Administration
 Economics
 Public Accounting
 College of Political Studies
Law
Liberal Studies

It offers postgraduate studies as well.

External links
CEUM | Student Council
Universidad Metropolitana

Universities and colleges in Caracas
Educational institutions established in 1970
1970 establishments in Venezuela